Harry and His Bucket Full of Dinosaurs is a series of children's books written and drawn by Ian Whybrow and Adrian Reynolds. The series is about a five-year-old boy named Harry, who has a bucket full of six dinosaurs named Taury, Trike, Patsy, Pterence, Sid, and Steggy. In the books the dinosaurs talk to Harry but seem to be toys to the other characters. The other main characters are Mum, Nana, Harry's best friend Charlie and Harry's sister Sam.

It was later adapted into a British-Canadian 104-episode animated television series of the same name, which premiered on Teletoon in Canada on March 28, 2005 and ended in 2008. It is a co-production between CCI Releasing in Canada and Collingwood O'Hare Entertainment Ltd. in the United Kingdom, in association with Discovery Kids Latin America, Teletoon (season 1), Treehouse TV (season 2), Cartoon Network, (season 1), Super RTL (season 1), Channel 5 Broadcasting Limited (season 2), and Playhouse Disney UK. In the TV series Harry plays with the dinosaurs by jumping into the bucket, which transports him to another world, called DinoWorld. Although the dinosaurs are toy-sized in the real world, within DinoWorld they become dinosaur-sized, while Harry retains his actual size. The TV episodes are available on DVD in two volumes.

Recently, it was announced that the show would have a series of apps for the iOS and Android platform and will include some interactive elements.

In the US, Cartoon Network aired the series as part of its short-lived Tickle-U block. Reruns of the series aired on Qubo from June 30, 2012, to December 25, 2020.

Book list
Harry and the Dinosaurs go on holiday
Harry and the Bucket Full of Dinosaurs
Harry and the Dinosaurs at the Museum
Harry and the Dinosaurs Make a Splash
Harry and the Dinosaurs Go Wild
Harry and the Dinosaurs say "Raahh"
Harry and the Robots
Romp in the Swamp
Harry and the Dinosaurs Make a Christmas Wish
Harry and the Dinosaurs go to School
Harry and the Dinosaurs have a Very Busy Day
Harry and the Dinosaurs Play Hide and Seek
Harry and the Dinosaurs Tell the Time
Harry and the Snow King
Harry and the Dinosaurs and the Bucketful of Stories
 A compilation of Harry and His Bucketful of Dinosaurs, Harry and the Dinosaurs say "Raahh", Harry and the Robots, Romp in the Swamp and Harry and the Snow King (Edition in UK with Audio CD read by Andrew Sachs)

Voice cast

Canadian cast

Andrew Chalmers as Harry
Jamie Watson as Taury the T-Rex
Ron Rubin as Trike the Triceratops
Andrew Sabiston as Pterence the Pterodactylus
Stacey DePass as Patsy the Apatosaurus
Juan Chioran as Sid the Scelidosaurus
Jonathan Wilson as Steggy the Stegosaurus
Amanda Soha as Charley/Charlie
Susan Roman as Harry's mother
Bryn McAuley as Sam, Harry's big sister
Ellen-Ray Hennessy as Nana

British cast
Emma Tate as Harry/Harry's mother
Jimmy Hibbert as Taury
Tom Eastwood as Trike
Ben Small as Pterence/Sid
Lynn Cleckner as Patsy/Sam
David Holt as Steggy

Development
Development for the series started in 2001, under the book's American title of Sammy and the Dinosaurs, as a co-production with Catalyst Entertainment and Gullane Entertainment, where the latter would have full distribution rights. By 2003, the then-merged CCI Entertainment ended their partnership with HIT Entertainment (who purchased Gullane back in October 2002) and re-acquiring its library. The series then was renamed to its original name, and was announced that CCI would co-produce the series with Collingwood O'Hare Entertainment.

Episode list
Episode titles for season one are taken directly from the episodes. Episode titles for season two are taken from the official Harry and His Bucket Full of Dinosaurs website. There are a number of differences between the actual titles and the titles as listed on the website. In all episodes, the first words spoken by the dinosaurs or Harry are the title of the episode.

Season 1 (2005–2006)

Season 2 (2007–2008)

References

External links

Official site, Ian Whybrow

2000s British children's television series
2000s British animated television series
2005 British television series debuts
2008 British television series endings
2000s Canadian children's television series
2000s Canadian animated television series
2005 Canadian television series debuts
2008 Canadian television series endings
2000s preschool education television series
Animated preschool education television series
British preschool education television series
Canadian preschool education television series
British children's animated fantasy television series
Canadian children's animated fantasy television series
English-language television shows
Qubo
Teletoon original programming
Treehouse TV original programming
British television shows based on children's books
Canadian television shows based on children's books
Television series by 9 Story Media Group
Animated television series about children
Animated television series about dinosaurs
Children's novels about dinosaurs
Series of children's books